George Baerveldt, M.B.Ch.B., was a Professor in the Department of Ophthalmology at the University of California, Irvine.

Baerveldt developed and held four patents related to the Baerveldt Glaucoma Implant, a device for the drainage of excess fluid from the eye in complex cases of glaucoma.

Professor Baerveldt was also one of the inventors of the Trabectome, a device for minimally-invasive glaucoma surgery.

Dr. Baerveldt died on April 13, 2021, while recuperating from vascular surgery.

References

External links
 "George Baerveldt, M.D.". UC Irvine Department of Ophthalmology.
 "Trabectome". Manufacturer's Website.
 "Baerveldt Glaucoma Implant". Manufacturer's Website.

Living people
American ophthalmologists
University of California, Irvine faculty
Year of birth missing (living people)